The Qassim building collapse was a building collapse that left at least 9 Asian (including 8 Pakistanis) construction workers dead and another 6 injured in Al-Qassim Region, Saudi Arabia. The disaster occurred on 28 April 2015.

References

Building collapses in 2015
2015 in Saudi Arabia
Building collapses in Saudi Arabia
Al-Qassim Province
April 2015 events in Asia